Jongno (종로) is a 1933 Korean film starring Na Woon-gyu. It premiered at DanSungSa theater in downtown Seoul.

Plot
The film is a melodrama in which Na Woon-gyu's character breaks up with his girlfriend and becomes a vagabond. The girlfriend marries another man. When Na returns and discovers her married, he leaves again.

References

External links
 Images from Jongno  at The Korean Film Archive (KOFA)

See also
 Korea under Japanese rule
 List of Korean-language films
 Cinema of Korea

1933 films
Pre-1948 Korean films
Korean silent films
Korean black-and-white films